Mainalo is a village in the municipal unit of Falanthos, Arcadia, Greece. Population 46 (2011). It is situated at 880 m elevation, south of Mainalo mountain, and northwest of Tripoli.

Historical population

References

Populated places in Arcadia, Peloponnese